Ariamsvlei is a settlement of about 500 people in the ǁKaras Region of southern Namibia and a small border post between Namibia and South Africa, located  east of Karasburg on the national road B3. It lies at 804 metres (2641 ft) above sea level.

Ariamsvlei is an important rest stop for long-distance trucks, and a railway stop on the line between Windhoek and Upington. It belongs to the Karasburg electoral constituency. The settlement has a petrol station, a shop, and a restaurant.

References 

Ariamsvlei, Namibia Page. Falling Rain Genomics. Retrieved on 2008-04-21.

Villages in Namibia
Namibia–South Africa border crossings
Populated places in the ǁKaras Region